Gast is a surname, and may refer to:

Alice Gast, academic and administrator
Camille du Gast, sportswoman and social pioneer
Eric Gast, record producer
John Gast (activist), English trade unionist
John Gast (baseball), American baseball player
John Gast (painter), Prussian-born painter
Leon Gast (1936–2021), American documentary filmmaker
Luce de Gast, 13th century nobleman
Margaret Gast, German-born American racing cyclist
Paul Werner Gast, geologist
Silke Gast, German javelin thrower

See also
Gast gun, twin barreled machine gun 

German-language surnames
Surnames of German origin
Surnames from nicknames